Jackson Christian Rutledge (born April 1, 1999) is an American professional baseball pitcher in the Washington Nationals organization.

Amateur career
Rutledge attended Rockwood Summit High School in Fenton, Missouri. In 2017, as a senior, he went 7-1 with a 1.19 ERA. He went undrafted in the 2017 Major League Baseball draft and enrolled at the University of Arkansas to play college baseball for the Arkansas Razorbacks.

As a freshman at Arkansas in 2018, Rutledge appeared in 12 games in which he went 3-0 with a 3.45 ERA. He began the year as a key pitcher out of the bullpen, but struggled in Southeastern Conference play, compiling a 27.00 ERA in three games, and did not pitch at all during the month of May. He announced that month that he would transfer and spend the 2019 season at San Jacinto College. During the 2018 offseason, he committed to play his 2020 junior season at the University of Kentucky. Rutledge broke out as a sophomore for the San Jacinto Central Ravens in 2019, pitching to a 9-2 record with a 0.87 ERA in 13 games, striking out 134 in  innings.

Professional career
Rutledge was considered one of the top prospects for the 2019 Major League Baseball draft. He was selected by the Washington Nationals with the 17th overall pick. He agreed to terms with the Nationals on June 17 for $3.45 million. He made his professional debut with the Rookie-level Gulf Coast League Nationals before being promoted to the Auburn Doubledays of the Class A Short Season New York–Penn League after one game. He was promoted to the Hagerstown Suns of the Class A South Atlantic League in July, with whom he finished the year. Over ten starts between the three clubs, he went 2-0 with a 3.13 ERA, striking out 39 over  innings.

Rutledge did not play a minor league game in 2020 due to the cancellation of the minor league season caused by the COVID-19 pandemic. To begin the 2021 season, he was assigned to the Wilmington Blue Rocks of the High-A East. After pitching  innings in which he gave up 15 earned runs and 17 hits, he was placed on the injured list with a shoulder injury. He was activated in July, and reassigned to the Fredericksburg Nationals of the Low-A East. He was placed back on the injured list in early August, and returned later that month. Over 22 innings pitched with Fredericksburg, Rutledge went 1-2 with a 5.32 ERA and 26 strikeouts. He was selected to play in the Arizona Fall League for the Surprise Saguaros after the season. Rutledge pitched 3⅓ innings in relief for the Saguaros in the championship game on November 20, 2021, versus the Mesa Solar Sox, giving up two runs but striking out seven. MLB Pipeline rated him as Surprise's top performer in the game, a 6–0 Mesa win. He returned to Fredericksburg to open the 2022 season.

Rutledge was optioned to the Double-A Harrisburg Senators to begin the 2023 season.

Pitching style
Rutledge stands , taller than the average pitcher, although his arm action is relatively short and compact. Rutledge introduced the slider during his 2019 season with San Jacinto after tweaking his grip to differentiate it from his curveball. He has credited Ross Detwiler, also a first-round selection of the Washington Nationals in the 2007 MLB draft, for helping him develop his changeup.

References

External links

San Jac bio

1999 births
Living people
Baseball players from Missouri
Baseball pitchers
San Jacinto Central Ravens baseball players
Arkansas Razorbacks baseball players
Gulf Coast Nationals players
Auburn Doubledays players
Wilmington Blue Rocks players
Fredericksburg Nationals players
Surprise Saguaros players